The 2006 Formula V6 Asia Series was the first season of the series. The season started on May 13–14 in Sepang and ended on October 21–22 in Zuhai.

Drivers and teams

Race calendar

Full Series Results
Points are awarded in both races as following: 15, 12, 10, 8, 6, 5, 4, 3, 2 for 9th and 1 bonus points for pole position in the first of the two venue races but only awarded to drivers, not for teams. Only the drivers that achieve races are awarded by points.

Drivers

Teams

† = 4 penalty points.

Sources
formula3.cc, results.

External links
 Formula Asia V6 by Renault official website

Formula V6 Asia by Renault season 2006
Formula V6 Asia seasons
2006 in Asian sport
Renault V6 Asia